A national third tier of Japanese league football was first established in 1992, as the second division of former Japan Football League, though it only lasted for two seasons. In 1999, following the establishment of J.League Division 2, a new Japan Football League was created, fulfilling the third tier until a fully professional J3 League was launched in 2014.

(former) Japan Football League Division 2 (1992–1993)
The old Japan Football League was established simultaneously with creation of J.League and was initially a two-level tournament but that lasted only for two inaugural seasons.

Japan Football League (JFL) (1999–2013)
With the establishment of J.League Division 2, the new Japan Football League was automatically moved a tier down the pyramid comparing to its discontinued namesake.

†Not promoted to J2For additional promoted teams, the number in parentheses indicates their position after the end of the season.

J3 League (2014–present)
In 2014, J. League launched a fully professional third division.

† Not promoted to J2.

‡ Not promoted to J2 due to a loss in the play-off series.

Total wins
Clubs in bold compete in J3 as of 2023 season. Clubs in italic no longer exist.Years in italic indicate seasons of amateur football (former and new Japan Football League).

See also
Japan Football League (1992–98)
Japan Football League
J3 League
List of Japanese football champions
List of winners of J2 League and predecessors

Sources
Contents of Domestic Competition of Football in Japan

Winners
Japan Football League (1992–1998)
Japan
Winners